William Earl Marriott (August 18, 1893 – August 11, 1969) was an American professional baseball third baseman. He played in Major League Baseball (MLB) for the Chicago Cubs, Boston Braves and Brooklyn Robins over six seasons from 1917 to 1927. He was married to Edna Marriott (nee Pike) at the time of his death.

References

External links

1893 births
1969 deaths
Major League Baseball third basemen
Brooklyn Robins players
Boston Braves players
Chicago Cubs players
Baseball players from Kansas
Reading Marines players
Oakland Oaks (baseball) players
Mobile Bears players
Toledo Mud Hens players
Buffalo Bisons (minor league) players
Reading Keystones players
Atlanta Crackers players
People from Pratt, Kansas